Submarine No.71 (Number 71) was an experimental high-speed submarine built for the Japanese Imperial Navy (IJN) during the 1930s.

Design and description
Submarine No.71 was designed to test high-speed performance underwater. Nonetheless, the boat was the fastest submarine in the world underwater when built, beating the previous record set by the similar World War I-era British R-class. She displaced  surfaced and  submerged.

For surface running, the boat was powered by a single  diesel engine that drove one propeller shaft. When submerged the propeller was driven by a  electric motor. She could reach  on the surface and  underwater. The boat was armed with three internal bow  torpedo tubes; each was provided with one torpedo.

Construction and career
Submarine No.71 was laid down by the Kure Naval Arsenal in December 1937 and was launched that same month by being lowered into the water by a crane. She was completed in August 1938; trials showed that her small size and low-powered diesel made her hard to handle on the surface. After extensive evaluations the boat was scrapped in 1940, and the lessons learned contributed to the development of the Sen Taka-class, and the Sen Taka Sho-class.

See also
 German submarine V-80
 British R-class submarine

Notes

References
 

Submarine classes
Submarines of the Imperial Japanese Navy
Experimental submarines
1938 ships
Ships built by Kure Naval Arsenal